Opasna igra (English: Dangerous Game) is a single by Serbian singer Nikolija. Released on 4 June 2015 under IDJTunes, it was later included to Nikolija's 2016 debut album №1. The lyrics were written by her partner Relja Popović and Đorđe Đorđević, while the music was created by Ivan Obradović and Senad Bislimi from Atelje Impuls. "Opasna igra" was produced by Nikolija's frequent collaborators Marko Peruničić and Nebojša Arežina from Atelje Trag. Musically, it was described as pop-folk with contemporary R&B influences.

Music video
"Opasna igra" was released alongside accompanying music video, which was directed by Andrej Ilić from IDJVideos and Greek filmmaker Pedram Voss. It was shot on a beach in Athens, Greece during May 2015, as well as in Belgrade. The video was edited and produced by Đorđe Trbović and Boris Zec and released under IDJVideos.

The concept behind it was to showcase Nikolija's lifestyle during her university years in Athens.

At the end of the year "Opasna igra" was declared the most viewed Serbian video of 2015. The music video has collected over 48 million views, as of December 2022.

Credits and personnel
Credits adapted from the liner notes of №1.
 Nikolija - vocals
 Relja Popović - lyrics
 Đorđe Đorđević - lyrics
 Atelje Impuls - music
 Atelje Trag - arrangement
 Ksenija Milošević - backing vocals
 Eljez Šabani - clarinet and saxophone

Release history

References 

Serbian songs
2015 songs
Pop-folk songs
Music videos shot in Belgrade